The discography of Hélène Ségara, a French pop singer, consists of eleven studio albums, various compilation albums, one live albums and twenty-nine singles. Throughout her singer career, Ségara has obtained success in France and Francophone Belgium.

Her debut album, Cœur de verre, was released on 17 September 1996. It sold about 400,000 copies, peaked at number six in France, and provided the top 15 singles "Je vous aime adieu" and "Les Vallées d'Irlande", and the number-one hit "Vivo per lei (je vis pour elle)", a duet with Italian singer Andrea Bocelli.

On 25 January 2000, Ségara released her second album, Au Nom d'une Femme, which achieved more success and remained her most successful album. It reached the top of the French and Belgium charts and two its singles, "Il y a trop de gens qui t'aiment" and "Elle, tu l'aimes...", became smash hits, reaching respectively the first and the third position on the SNEP chart. The album was a triumph: it sold about 1.3 million units and won a NRJ Music Awards in 2001 in the category 'Francophone album of the year'.

The third studio album, Hélène, was released in 2002 and contains Ségara's previous songs recorded in Spanish-language and had minor success. In March 2003, the fourth album Humaine was launched and immediately topped the French chart, selling about 500,000 units. It spawning the top three singles "L'amour est un soleil" and a duet with Laura Pausini, "On n'oublie jamais rien, on vit avec".

The next two albums, Quand l'éternité... and Mon Pays c'est la terre, were respectively released in September 2006 and November 2008. They both can be considered as failures, as although the first one entered the French chart at number one, it fell very quickly, and the second one remained for a short number of weeks in low positions on the charts.

Albums

Studio albums

Live albums

Compilations

Singles

1 Promotional singles

DVD
 Au Nom d'une Femme
 Regards, released on 24 May 2005, Gold

Tours
 Au Nom d'une Femme (2000–2002)
 Humaine (2003–2004)
 Quand l'éternité (2007–2008)

References

Discographies of French artists
Pop music discographies